Eodiaptomus is a genus of copepods in the family Diaptomidae, containing the following species:
Eodiaptomus draconisignivomi Brehm, 1952
Eodiaptomus indawgyi Dumont & Green, 2005
Eodiaptomus japonicus (Burckhardt, 1913)
Eodiaptomus lumholtzi (G. O. Sars, 1889)
Eodiaptomus phuphanensis Sanoamuang, 2001
Eodiaptomus phuvongi Sanoamuang & Sivongxay, 2004
Eodiaptomus sanoamuangae Reddy & Dumont, 1998
Eodiaptomus shihi Reddy, 1992
Eodiaptomus sinensis (Burckhardt, 1913)
Eodiaptomus wolterecki (Brehm, 1933)

References

Diaptomidae
Taxonomy articles created by Polbot